Donacoscaptes unipunctella is a moth in the family Crambidae. It was described by Stanisław Błeszyński in 1961. It is found in Paraná, Brazil.

References

Haimbachiini
Moths described in 1961